Worsnop is a surname. Notable people with the surname include:

Danny Worsnop (born 1990), British musician, singer, songwriter, vocal producer, and actor
Doug Worsnop (born 1952), American scientist
Thomas Worsnop (1821–1898), Australian soldier, historian and government official